Channel 4 Radio was a radio brand in the United Kingdom, launched by Channel Four Television Corporation in January 2007. On 11 October 2008 its closure was announced. It incorporated Oneword, in which Channel 4 purchased a 51% share in 2005, although it relinquished this share to co-owner UBS Media in January 2008.

Listeners were required to register an email address and user name with Channel 4 Radio and log in to listen.

See also
 4 Digital Group

References

 
Defunct radio stations in the United Kingdom